Rock Bottom Entertainment is an Indie record label founded in Detroit, Michigan in June 1997 by founder and C.E.O., Rafael "Rock" Howard.  In 1997, the first album released was "From The Bottom Up", which had instant success.  This album featured singles, Freak 4 Dollars and Pay Your Ticket.  In 1999, Alligator City was released, which featured the hit singles, Gatored Up, Roll Wit Us ( which included a video) and Linwood to Woodrow.  To date, Alligator City is one of the highest sold independent rap albums in Detroit history.  In 2002, Rock Bottom Entertainment released the highly anticipated, Who is Rock Bottom, which featured, NO.  The single, NO, was in heavy rotation on all local stations, which made it #1 across the country.  Following this single, Ain't Nothing But A Party, is still a fan favorite to this day.  In 2005, Rock Bottom Entertainment released, Blow: Based on True Stories, which introduced the Thug Division which featured singles, Go, Rock Bottom and We are on your Block.  Rock Bottom Entertainment has always appreciated everyone who has supported them and has plans on dropping more music in the future.

Stay tuned......

Discography
From The Bottom Up (1997)
Alligator City (1999)
Who Is Rock Bottom? (2002
Blow: Based On True Stories (2005)

Singles
 1997 "Freak 4 Dollars"
 2001 "Roll Wit Us"
 2000 "Gatored Up"  
 2002 "Ball Street"
 2002 "Can We Party?"
 2003 "No"
 2005 "We On Ya Block"
 2005 "Gangsta As A Wanna"

Current roster
Tango & Cash (Bathgate & Rod Dae)
Blackface
Tianna
J-Nutty  
Screwface
Thug Division (including T dot, Duke, Flame, Squash, B. Foy)
7 Mile Naturalz
DJ G-Raw
Big Herk

References

External links
 Rock Bottom Entertainment on Myspace

American record labels
Culture of Detroit
Record labels established in 1997
Companies based in Detroit
Hip hop record labels